Kanyo Dzhambazov (born 14 May 1911, date of death unknown) was a Bulgarian cyclist. He competed in the individual and team road race events at the 1936 Summer Olympics.

References

External links
 

1911 births
Year of death missing
Bulgarian male cyclists
Olympic cyclists of Bulgaria
Cyclists at the 1936 Summer Olympics
Place of birth missing